Fanny Iseult Britt (born 1977) is a Canadian playwright and translator living in Quebec.

She was born in Amos and grew up in Montreal. She studied playwriting at the National Theatre School of Canada, graduating in 2001.

In 2008, she founded Théâtre Debout with Geoffrey Gaquère and Johanne Haberlin.

She was the winner of the Governor General's Award for French-language drama at the 2013 Governor General's Awards for her play Bienveillance, and of the Governor General's Award for French-language drama at the 2021 Governor General's Awards for her novel Faire les sucres.

Works

Translations
 Kvetch by Steven Berkoff for Théâtre Niveau Parking
 The Adventures of Tom Sawyer by Mark Twain for Théâtre de la Petite Marée
 The Good Person of Setzuan by Bertolt Brecht for Théâtre du Trident
 Cul-de-sac by Daniel MacIvor for the 
 Half Life by John Mighton for the Carrefour international de théâtre de Québec
 Orphans by Dennis Kelly for Théâtre La Licorne

Plays
 Honey Pie (2003)
 Couche avec moi (c'est l'hiver) (2006)
 Hôtel Pacifique (2009)
 Enquête sur le pire (2010)
 Chaque Jour (2011)
 Bienveillance (2012)

Novels
 Les maisons (2015)
 Faire les sucres (2021)

She has also written youth literature including the series Félicien and the graphic novel Jane, le renard et moi with illustrations by Isabelle Arsenault. She contributed to the Télé-Québec series Tactik.

References 

1977 births
Living people
Canadian dramatists and playwrights in French
Canadian novelists in French
Governor General's Award-winning dramatists
Writers from Quebec
Canadian women dramatists and playwrights
Canadian women novelists
21st-century Canadian dramatists and playwrights
21st-century Canadian novelists
21st-century Canadian women writers
Canadian women non-fiction writers
21st-century Canadian translators
Governor General's Award-winning fiction writers